Kavak is a district of Samsun Province of Turkey. Kavak is located 51 km away from Samsun.  It has 600 m height from the sea level. The mayor is Ibrahim Saricaoglu (AKP).

Kavak is located on the Samsun-Ankara highway, which brings it economical and social advantages. The most important source of income for Kavak is chicken farms. The famous Turkish wrestler, Yasar Dogu was born in Kavak, Emirli village.
One of the most famous citizens is Ali KIVRAK (Bey) (1898-1981). He participated in almost all Turkish Independence Wars as an infantry soldier. Cukurbuk village, especially Cote district, is popular with its nice agricultural products, like apple, cherry and corn. Cote district also has many chicken farms. KIVRAK family is the founder of Cote district. Mustafa KIVRAK and Fikret KIVRAK are the most popular chicken farm owners. Ismet KIVRAK who was retired from Turkish Air Force was also born in Cote district. Yaşar Doğu - Olympic gold medalist sports wrestler was born here.

References

 
Populated places in Samsun Province